Farm to Market Roads in Texas are owned and maintained by the Texas Department of Transportation (TxDOT).

By route number

Farm/Ranch to Market Road

Ranch Road
Separate-but-equal designation; not officially a Farm to Market or Ranch to Market Road
 Ranch Road 1

See also

f
+
Farm to Market Roads